The Serengeti is a geographical region in Tanzania.

Serengeti may also refer to:

Places
Serengeti District, one of the five districts in the Mara Region of Tanzania
Serengeti National Park, a national park in Serengeti region
Serengeti Park, Europe's largest safari park, in Lower Saxony, Germany

Other uses
Serengeti (film) or Serengeti Shall Not Die, a 1959 German documentary by Bernhard Grzimek
Serengeti (rapper), American hip-hop artist
"Serengeti" (song), by Infernal, 2000
Serengeti (sunglasses brand), a designer brand of sunglasses
Serengeti cat, a breed of cat
MV Serengeti, a Tanzanian passenger and cargo ship on Lake Victoria
Serengeti, a 2019 television documentary narrated by Lupita Nyong'o

See also